Paul Alexander Nolan is a Canadian actor who appeared in Jeremy O. Harris’ Slave Play at New York Theatre Workshop. He was nominated for a Drama Desk Award for his performance in the musical Bright Star.

Early life 
Nolan grew up in Rouleau, Saskatchewan, a small rural community in Canada. His love of music was developed by listening to folk, opera, show tunes, and classical music as a child.  He then attended the Randolph College for the Performing Arts. Following college, he took a gig with Disney Cruise Line, performing abbreviated versions of animated movies like “Hercules."

Personal life 
He is a hockey fan, with his favorite team being the Toronto Maple Leafs.

Nolan is married to actress Keely Hutton.

Broadway credits

Filmography

References 

20th-century Canadian male actors
21st-century Canadian male actors
Male actors from Saskatchewan
Living people
People from Rouleau, Saskatchewan
Year of birth missing (living people)
Canadian male film actors
Canadian male stage actors
Canadian male television actors